Lue is a small village in New South Wales, Australia. At the 2006 census, Lue and the surrounding rural area had a population of 815.

It is not on the main road,  but the NSW TrainLink bus services from Gulgong detours several times a week to service Lue.

Lue was prosperous after the opening of the railway to Mudgee in 1884, but declined from the 1930s. Lue Hotel and Lue Pottery are businesses still in operation.

A few kilometres from Lue on the Mudgee Road lies the historic Havilah homestead with its adjoining Havilah Memorial Church.

School
 Lue Public School

Churches
 Our Lady of Lourdes Catholic Church
 St Luke's Anglican Church

Heritage listings
Lue has a number of heritage-listed sites, including:
 Wallerawang-Gwabegar railway: Lue railway station

References

Towns in New South Wales
Mid-Western Regional Council